Gary Tatintsian (born 1954) an art dealer, owner of the Gary Tatintsian Gallery.

Life and career
After leaving the Soviet Union to Germany in 1989, Gary Tatintsian opened Tatunz art gallery in Berlin. The gallery was one of the first to show the works of Russian avant-garde artists: Alexander Rodchenko, Vladimir Nemukhin, Eduard Steinberg and Evgeny Chubarov. At the same time, Gary started working with such promising Western artists as Peter Doig, Georg Baselitz, Zaha Hadid and Daniel Richter, who lately became the key figures of the Western art market.

In 1998, Gary Tatintsian moved to New York City, where he continued the gallery business and opened Gary Tatintsian Gallery in Manhattan's Chelsea neighborhood. The list of represented artists was expanded by such names as Frank Stella, Peter Halley, George Condo and other prominent American artists.

The gallery space in Moscow was opened in 2005. The gallery on Serebryanicheskaya embankment regularly hosts exhibitions of contemporary artists. The gallery public projects include exhibitions and lectures in the largest world museums: the State Hermitage Museum, The Pushkin State Museum of Fine Arts, Garage Museum of Contemporary Art, The New Museum, etc.

In 2022, a new gallery space was opened in the Alserkal Avenue in Dubai.

In addition to exhibition management, the gallery works with private and public collections, and also curates the foundation of the artist Evgeny Chubarov.

References

External links
Gary Tatintsian Gallery

1954 births
Living people
American art dealers